WQEN (103.7 FM, "103.7 the Q") is a radio station licensed to serve Trussville, Alabama, United States.  The station is owned by San Antoniobased iHeartMedia. Other stations in the Birmingham market owned by iHeartMedia include WDXB (102.5 FM), WERC-FM (105.5 FM), WERC (960 AM), and WMJJ (96.5 FM).  The station has studios at Beacon Ridge Tower in Birmingham (near Red Mountain) and its transmitter is on the west end of the Red Mountain range.

It broadcasts a Top 40 (CHR) station to Birmingham and north-central Alabama.

History
In October 1966, the station that is now WQEN signed on as WLJM, licensed to Gadsden. The call letters stood for Lloyd, John and Mary Faye, the three children of original owner Charlie Boman. In 1974, WJLM was sold to Charles Smithgall and Mike McDougald who operated WAAX, also in Gadsden. In 1975, the FM station took its current call letters. After a brief run as an automated easy listening radio station, WQEN became one of the first FM Top 40 stations in Alabama. Since then, WQEN has been a Top 40 station.

By 1976, the transmitter for WQEN was moved to Steele, some 15 miles south of Gadsden, and the power of its signal was increased to 100,000 watts. This enabled the station to cover Gadsden, east Alabama, and many areas of the Birmingham metropolitan area. During this time, WQEN was known as either "Super Q104, WQEN", "SuperHot Q104", and "Q104 WQEN, The Southern Super Giant". Except for a brief period in the late 1980s when the station was known as "103.7 QFM", the station was called "Q104" for over 20 years. Until the mid 1990s, WQEN was primarily focused on Gadsden, Anniston, and eastern Alabama.

In 1998, WQEN began broadcasting from a tower near Springville, enabling its signal to cover the entire Birmingham market, and began broadcasting from studios in Birmingham. The station was rebranded under the current "103.7 The Q" moniker. At about the same time that the station focused on the Birmingham market, it began simulcasting on WQEM (101.5 FM), licensed to Columbiana.  The simulcast continued until 2002, when WQEM was sold to Glen Iris Baptist School in Birmingham, the owners of WGIB.

WQEN was the first Top 40 station in the Birmingham market since WAPI-FM (I-95) dropped the format in 1994. Ironically, a second station in the market adopted the same format a few months later when WEDA, known on the air as Hot 97.3, signed on.  That station changed formats in 2000. The DJ line-up featured Rick and Bubba in the mornings, Scott Bohannon (formerly of WAPI-FM/I-95) in middays, and Luka (formerly of WRAX/107.7 The X) in the afternoons.

In 2005, WQEN was one of several stations in north Alabama and southern Tennessee that changed either their city of license, broadcast frequency, or both.  As a result, WQEN, now licensed to Trussville rather than Gadsden, began broadcasting from Red Mountain in Birmingham, greatly improving its signal in Jefferson County and Shelby County.

References

External links
WQEN official website
Q-104 Tribute Website

QEN
Radio stations established in 1966
Contemporary hit radio stations in the United States
1966 establishments in Alabama
IHeartMedia radio stations